Giselle is a ballet.

Giselle may also refer to:
 Giselle (film), a film based on the ballet
 Giselle (given name), a given name and list of people with the name
 Giselle (Japanese singer), member of Aespa
 Giselle Rosselli (b. 1990), Australian singer-songwriter known as Giselle
 Giselle, an album by Parzival

See also
 Gisele (disambiguation)
 Giselli Monteiro, Brazilian model and actress
 Gisselle (born 1969), Puerto Rican singer